Matthew Rowley (born June 4, 1993 in Red Deer, Alberta) is a retired Canadian Olympic ski jumper. Rowley retired after being disqualified in the 2014 Olympics in Sochi.

Olympic career 
In 2014, Rowley competed in the Winter Olympics that took place in Sochi, Russia. He was disqualified due to a suit violation.

References

1993 births
Canadian male ski jumpers
Living people
Olympic ski jumpers of Canada
Ski jumpers at the 2014 Winter Olympics
Sportspeople from Red Deer, Alberta